Claire Louise Whichcord (born 9 December 1972) is an English former cricketer who played as a right-handed batter and right-arm medium bowler. She appeared in one One Day International for England against The Netherlands at College Park, Dublin in the 1995 Women's European Cricket Cup. She bowled seven overs for 22 runs but did not take a wicket and did not bat. She played county cricket for Kent and club cricket for Old Stacians in the Southern Premier Cricket League. She is currently head teacher of Cliftonville Primary School in Margate.

References

External links
 
 

1972 births
Living people
Sportspeople from Dover, Kent
England women One Day International cricketers
Kent women cricketers